Rissverklebung is a technique of restoration of torn paintings by reweaving individual threads.

See also
Conservation and restoration of paintings

External links
WAAC newsletter: "Conference Review: Rissverklebung – or roughly translated: single thread tear repair." September 2000.
"How to mend a Picasso painting", Slate, October 19, 2006, mentions Rissverklebung.

Textile arts
Museology
Conservation and restoration of cultural heritage